Elections to Liverpool City Council were held on Tuesday 1 November 1881. One third of the council seats were up for election, the term of office of each councillor being three years.

Ten of the sixteen wards were uncontested.

After the election, the composition of the council was:

Election result

Ward results

* - Retiring Councillor seeking re-election

Abercromby

Castle Street

Everton

Exchange

Great George

Lime Street

North Toxteth

Pitt Street

Rodney Street

St. Anne Street

St. Paul's

St. Peter's

Scotland

South Toxteth

Vauxhall

West Derby

By-elections

No. 12, Lime Street, 25 November 1881

Caused by the death of Councillor John Henstock (Party? Lime Street, 
elected 4 April 1881)
which was reported to the Council on 9 November 1881.

No. 7, St. Peter's, 25 November 1881

Caused by the resignation of Councillor Alexander Balfour (Liberal, St. Peter's, 
elected 1 November 1879).

See also

 Liverpool City Council
 Liverpool Town Council elections 1835 - 1879
 Liverpool City Council elections 1880–present
 Mayors and Lord Mayors of Liverpool 1207 to present
 History of local government in England

References

1881
1881 English local elections
November 1881 events
1880s in Liverpool